The 2008 Vermont Republican presidential primary took place on March 4, 2008. Arizona Senator John McCain was the winner of the primary.

Results

* Candidate dropped out of the race before the primary

See also
 2008 Republican Party presidential primaries
 2008 Vermont Democratic presidential primary

References

Vermont
2008 Vermont elections
Vermont Republican primaries